The Bharatiya Janata Party (BJP) is one of the two major parties in the political system of Republic of India, the other being the Indian National Congress (INC). , it is the country's largest political party in terms of representation in the Lok Sabha (House of the People), and is the world's largest political party in terms of primary membership. Established in 1980, the BJP's platform is generally considered as the right-wing of the political spectrum.

The Rajya Sabha (Council of States) is the upper house of the Parliament of India. , 252 BJP leaders have been a member of the Rajya Sabha, out of which 82 are sitting members. Members of the Rajya Sabha are indirectly elected by state and territorial legislatures using single transferable votes, while twelve members are appointed by the President of India for their contributions to art, literature, science, and social services. According to the Constitution of India, the Rajya Sabha has certain special powers being a federal chamber. The Rajya Sabha is not subjected to dissolution unlike the Lok Sabha, and the term of its member is six years.

Seventeen of the Rajya Sabha members from the BJP are women, out of which six are sitting members — Roopa Ganguly, Kanta Kardam, Sonal Mansingh, Nirmala Sitharaman, and Saroj Pandey. Eleven of the sitting members from the BJP are members of the Union Council of Ministers of India. Jaswant Singh represented Rajasthan for four terms which amounted to a total tenure length of 7398 days, the longest for any Rajya Sabha member from the BJP. The only other BJP members to serve four terms as a Rajya Sabha member are Arun Jaitley, Pramod Mahajan, Venkaiah Naidu, and Ravi Shankar Prasad. Among the sitting members, Mukhtar Abbas Naqvi has the longest total tenure length of  days.

BJP members have represented 21 states and union territories in the Rajya Sabha. Out of these, Uttar Pradesh has contributed the highest number of members (44). It is followed by Madhya Pradesh and Gujarat with 36 and 34 members respectively.

Rajya Sabha members from the Bharatiya Janata Party

Key
  – Sitting member
  – Resigned
  – Died during the term
  – Elected to Lok Sabha during the term
 § – Disqualified
  – Seat declared vacant

Notes

References
General

Specific

See also

List of chief ministers from the Bharatiya Janata Party
List of presidents of the Bharatiya Janata Party

External links

Bharatiya Janata Party